The 25th British Academy Film Awards, given by the British Academy of Film and Television Arts in 1972, honoured the best films of 1971.

Winners and nominees
BAFTA Fellowship: Freddie Young

Statistics

See also
 44th Academy Awards
 24th Directors Guild of America Awards
 29th Golden Globe Awards
 24th Writers Guild of America Awards

Film025
1971 film awards
1972 in British cinema
1971 awards in the United Kingdom